Thori is a rural municipality in Parsa District in Province No. 2 of Nepal. It was formed in 2016 occupying current 5 sections (wards) from previous 3 former VDCs. It occupies an area of 128.67 km2 with a total population of 20,296.

References

Populated places in Parsa District
Rural municipalities of Nepal established in 2017
Rural municipalities in Madhesh Province